Eleonore Baur (7 September 1885 – 18 May 1981), also known as Sister Pia, was a senior Nazi Party figure and the only woman known to have participated in the Munich Beer Hall Putsch.

Early life
Born Eleonore Mayr in Bad Aibling, Bavaria, Baur's mother died when Baur was an infant, and when she was five Baur moved to Munich with her father and stepmother. 

In Munich, Baur left school aged 14 to work as a midwife's assistant. At 15 she gave birth to an illegitimate child whose fate is currently unknown. At 19 she gave birth to a second illegitimate son named Willhelm, whom she gave up for adoption, then soon after she moved to Egypt to work as a nurse's assistant at a Cairo hospital.

Baur returned to Munich in 1907, calling herself "Sister Pia", and worked for the Roman Catholic charitable order Gelbes Kreuz (Yellow Cross). In 1908 or 1909 she married Ludwig Baur, a mechanical engineer. The marriage ended in divorce after five or six years. Baur served as a nurse during World War I and then assisted the Freikorps Oberland troops during their battle against the Bavarian Soviet Republic and in the Baltic campaign in 1919. 

In 1923 she married for the second time, a hotel manager named Sponseil ten years her junior. This marriage also ended in divorce.

Nazi Party
In 1919, Baur met Adolf Hitler on a tram in Munich and helped found the National Socialist German Workers' Party (Nationalsozialistische Deutsche Arbeiterpartei; NSDAP), and was Member No. 11. Baur became one of the most visible Nazi figures in Munich in the spring of 1920, and was arrested on 11 March 1920 for disturbing the peace following an anti-Semitic speech at a women's rally in Munich. Her subsequent acquittal made her a hero of the Nazi movement.

Baur continued to be active in German politics, giving speeches and organising Nazi-based charitable events, and on 9 November 1923 was the only woman to participate in the Beer Hall Putsch, during which she received minor injuries and for which she later received the Blood Order, being one of only two German and 14 Austrian women to be awarded the party's highest decoration. 

Throughout the rise of the Nazis and following their assumption of power in 1933, Baur remained close to the Nazi leadership, accompanying Hitler on picnic trips, and Heinrich Himmler appointed her welfare sister for the Waffen-SS, reaching the rank of General.

In 1934, Baur founded the National Socialist Order of Sisters (Schwesternschaft), becoming its honorary chairwoman in 1937. She was promoted under the Nazi regime as the ideal Nazi woman (Der Spiegel called her "the nurse of the Nazi nation") and her role in the nascent Nazi party was well known. Known as a fanatical Nazi who hated Jews and Poles, Baur received a number of medals, including the Silesian Eagle Order, the Silver Medal for Bravery, the above mentioned Blood Order, and the Baltikum Cross.

Dachau
Baur played a major role in the construction and administration of Dachau and, while there is no evidence Baur physically harmed prisoners, she was accused of bullying prisoners, staff and neighbours, and forcing prisoners to work on the renovations of the villa Hitler had given her in Oberhaching. The only woman allowed in Dachau, Baur gained a reputation in the camp as someone who "requisitioned anything that was not nailed down".

From a small nearby camp, München-Schwabing, groups of prisoners were "reportedly whipped and ordered to do manual labour" at Baur's home, including "cleaning her house, tending her garden and even building children’s toys."

Post-war
Baur was first arrested on war crimes charges in May 1945 but shortly thereafter released due to insufficient evidence. She then appeared before a denazification court in Munich in September 1949, where she was categorised as a major criminal, sentenced to ten years at Rebdorf labour camp and her personal property confiscated. 

Released from prison in 1950 for health reasons, Baur successfully applied for a pension and compensation in 1955 and returned to Oberhaching, where she died aged 95 in 1981.

Baur never renounced National Socialism, once stating, "There is only one Frederick the Great, there is only one Adolf Hitler, and there is only one Sister Pia."

References

Bibliography

 Hastings, D. (2010). Catholicism and the Roots of Nazism: Religious Identity and National Socialism, Oxford University Press: Oxford; .
 
 Mühlberger, D. (2004). Hitler's Voice: the Völkischer Beobachter, 1920–1933: Volume 2, Peter Lang: Oxford; .

1885 births
1981 deaths
Nazis who participated in the Beer Hall Putsch
People from Bad Aibling
People from the Kingdom of Bavaria
Nazi Party members
Nazi propagandists
Dachau concentration camp personnel
20th-century Freikorps personnel
Women in Nazi Germany
German women nurses
German nurses